Wichelen is a municipality located in the Denderstreek in the Belgian province of East Flanders, comprising the towns of ,  and Wichelen proper. In 2021, its population was 11,690 and its area 22.87 km².

The Molenbeek crosses Wichelen in Schellebelle, Serskamp and Wichelen.

Gallery

References

External links

 
The reference for Wichelen 

 
Municipalities of East Flanders
Populated places in East Flanders